In  accounting, the convention of conservatism, also known as the doctrine of prudence, is a policy of anticipating possible future losses but not future gains. This policy tends to understate rather than overstate net assets and net income, and therefore lead companies to "play safe". When given a choice between several outcomes where the probabilities of occurrence are equally likely, you should recognize that transaction resulting in the lower amount of profit, or at least the deferral of a profit.
 
In accounting, it states that when choosing between two solutions, the one that will be least likely to overstate assets and income should be selected. Essentially, "expected losses are losses but expected gains are not gains".

The conservatism principle is the foundation for the lower of cost or market rule, which states that you should record inventory at the lower of either its acquisition cost or its current market value.

Conservatism plays an important role in a number of accounting rules, including the allowance for doubtful debts and the lower of cost or market rule.

See also
Generally Accepted Accounting Principles (GAAP)
U.S. GAAP
International Financial Reporting Standards (IFRS)
 Conservatism concept 
 Prudence concept

References

Further reading 
 André, P., Filip, A., & Paugam, L. (2013). Impact of Mandatory IFRS Adoption on Conditional Conservatism in Europe.  ESSEC Working Papers WP1311, ESSEC Research Center, ESSEC Business School. Available at SSRN 1979748.

External links

Valuation (finance)
Investment

21